The ECAC Hockey Rookie of the Year is an annual award given out at the conclusion of the ECAC Hockey regular season to the best freshman player in the conference as voted by the coaches of each ECAC team.

The Rookie of the Year was first awarded in 1962 and every year thereafter.

The vote has been split for the award four times in its history.

Award winners

Winners by school

Winners by position

See also
ECAC Hockey Awards

References

General

Specific

External links
ECAC Hockey Awards (Incomplete)

College ice hockey trophies and awards in the United States